Burgos Municipality may refer to:
 Burgos Municipality, Tamaulipas, Mexico
 Burgos, Ilocos Sur, Philippines
 Burgos, Isabela, Philippines
 Burgos, La Union, Philippines
 Burgos, Pangasinan, Philippines

Municipality name disambiguation pages